The Pharaohs' Golden Parade was an event held in Cairo, Egypt on 3 April 2021, during which twenty-two mummies belonging to Kings and Queens of the New Kingdom of Ancient Egypt were moved from the Egyptian Museum in Tahrir Square to the National Museum of Egyptian Civilization in Fustat.

Background
The twenty-two mummies that were moved were discovered in two locations, the Royal Cache in Deir el-Bahari and the tomb of Amenhotep II, in 1881 and 1898, respectively. Since their discovery, they had been moved multiple times, until they were finally placed at the Egyptian Museum in Tahrir Square. Over the years, due to the increasing number of archaeological discoveries, the Egyptian Museum started to lose its ability to fully show the artefacts placed in it, which led the government to plan new museums including the Grand Egyptian Museum and the National Museum of Egyptian Civilization (NMEC). Ahead of the event, the Egyptian government began renovating Tahrir Square by restoring a broken-up Obelisk from Tanis that was built by King Ramesses II and putting it in the middle of the square, surrounded by four Sphinxes that were restored and brought from the Karnak Temple in Luxor, in addition to lighting work done in buildings overlooking the square.

Event

In order to be transported, the mummies were placed in containers with a nitrogen atmosphere. The containers were transported in vehicles that were made by Egypt exclusively for the parade and were designed and fitted with decoration based on Egyptian funerary boats. They also made Egyptian funerary boats for the event, which appeared several times during the event on the lake in front of the National Museum of Egyptian Civilization.

The parade started at 6:30 PM local time. It included a concert by the Egyptian United Philharmonic Orchestra led by Egyptian maestro Nader Abbassi, and composed by Egyptian composer Hesham Nazih. Production design was by Mohamed Attia and direction by Aahmad al Morsy. The concert included chants in the Ancient Egyptian language sung by Egyptian soprano Amira Selim. The lyrics of the hymn performed by Amira Selim, "A Reverence for Isis", were taken from inscriptions on the walls of the Deir el-Shelwit temple in Luxor. Other Ancient Egyptian lyrics that were sung during the parade came from the Book of the Dead and the Pyramid Texts. Two more songs in Classical Arabic and Egyptian Arabic were performed by Reham Abdel Hakim and Nesma Mahgoub, respectively.

Multiple recordings were shown during the parade, including one of Egyptian actors and actresses in many Ancient Egyptian archaeological sites, as well as a video of Egyptian actor Khaled El Nabawy touring many sites around Egypt that have been restored in the past few years, and the Egyptian actress Yousra appeared crowned on one of the Egyptian funerary boats that were made for the event.During the parade, roads leading to or near the two museums were closed and under heavy security. At the door of the NMEC, Egyptian President Abdel Fattah el-Sisi received the convoy, which was met with a 21-gun salute by the Republican Guard.

Egyptian president el-Sisi tweeted: "This majestic scene is evidence of the greatness of the Egyptian people, the guardians of this unique civilization extending deep into the depths of history."

Reception 
The event was well received by the Egyptian people, who expressed pride in their history and heritage, and the Egyptian ministry of finance issued commemorative Egyptian one pound and one hundred pound coins carrying the name and the official logo of the Pharaohs' Golden Parade, to symbolize this historic cultural event. The logo of the event is inspired by the ancient Egyptian belief in eternity and afterlife. The Egyptian ministry of communications and information technology (MCIT) issued QR Code commemorative stamps carrying the name and the official logo of the Pharaohs' Golden Parade, as well as ones carrying the pictures of the kings and the queens who were transported in the parade.

The parade route from the Egyptian Museum to the National Museum of Egyptian Civilization was about 5 km (3.1 miles) long. One reporter stated that the government "erected barriers throughout the city to prevent virtual viewers from catching a glimpse of impoverished areas along the parade route". Most Egyptians watched the parade on TV, as no vehicles or spectators were allowed along the route.

Mummies moved
The carriages moved in chronological order of their reigns:

King Seqenenre Tao
Queen Ahmose-Nefertari
King Amenhotep I
Queen Meritamun
King Thutmose I
King Thutmose II
Queen Hatshepsut
King Thutmose III
King Amenhotep II
King Thutmose IV
King Amenhotep III
Queen Tiye
King Seti I
King Ramesses II
King Merenptah
King Seti II
King Siptah
King Ramesses III
King Ramesses IV
King Ramesses V
King Ramesses VI
King Ramesses IX

See also

References

2021 in Egypt
New Kingdom of Egypt
Pharaohs
April 2021 events in Egypt
Museum events
Culture in Cairo